Factory No. 112 may refer to:

 Krasnoye Sormovo Factory No. 112, Russia
 Shenyang Aircraft Corporation, China, originally 112 Factory